Veprina is a rare Ediacaran coelenterate cnidarian found on the Zimny coast of the White Sea, Russia and was first described by Mikhail Fedonkin in 1980.

Diversity 
Veprina is a monotypic genus, with its only species being V. undosa. One trace fossil is attributed to the species.

Description 
Veprina has an oval-shaped body, with a diameter up to 60mm in width, and consists of an outer and inner ribbed zone. The inner zone consist of ridges that may or may not have been tentacles. An elongated central depression of the body can be seen, which probably imparts a bilateral character, which possibly corresponds to the oral aperture.

Discovery 
Veprina was discovered on the Zimny coast of the White Sea, Russia and was described by Mikhail A. Fedonkin in 1980.

Distribution 
Besides being found in the White Sea, a trace fossil of Veprina was also found in the Varyshev Formation on the Derlo Rver bank, Mogilev – Podolsky, Ukraine. The fossil has been described as feeding and locomotion traces of Veprina.

Ecology 
Having only one complete fossil specimen discovered, this makes interpretations of the ecology of the animal difficult to interpret. The trace fossil discovered in Ukraine suggests that the animal itself was capable of locomotion and was probably an active feeder.

See also 
 List of Ediacaran genera
 Mikhail Fedonkin
 White Sea

References 

Enigmatic prehistoric animal genera
Fossil taxa described in 1980
White Sea fossils
Ediacaran
Aquatic animals
Cnidarians